Verite may refer to:

 Vérité (born 1990), American pop singer
 Verité Research, an independent interdisciplinary think tank
 Verite Film Festival (Kashmir), an Indian film festival
 Verite (Dune), a fictional drug from Frank Herbert's Dune novel series
 Cinéma vérité, a style of documentary filmmaking
 Radio Verite, a New Jersey Haitian radio station

See also
 La Vérité (disambiguation)
 Cinéma vérité (disambiguation)